Dakhla Oasis Airport  is an airport serving the archaeological region of Dakhla Oasis, Egypt.

Airlines and destinations 
There are currently no scheduled services to and from the airport.

See also
Transport in Egypt
List of airports in Egypt

References

External links
 OurAirports - Egypt
   Great Circle Mapper - Dakhla Oasis
 Dakhla Oasis Airport

Airports in Egypt
New Valley Governorate